Cross Roads, Arkansas (or variant spellings) may refer to any one of many locations in the U.S. state of Arkansas:

 Crossroad, Ashley County, Arkansas
 Cross Roads, Bradley County, Arkansas
 Crossroads, Cleburne County, Arkansas   
 Cross Roads, Grant County, Arkansas
 Cross Roads, Hempstead County, Arkansas
 Cross Roads, Hot Spring County, Arkansas     
 Crossroads, Izard County, Arkansas   
 Crossroads, Jackson County, Arkansas
 Cross Roads, Little River County Arkansas   
 Cross Roads, Logan County, Arkansas   
 Cross Roads, Madison County, Arkansas   
 Cross Roads, Monroe County, Arkansas   
 Crossroad, Newton County, Arkansas
 Cross Roads, Ouachita County, Arkansas  
 Crossroad, Prairie County, Arkansas   
 Crossroads, Sebastian County, Arkansas    
 Crossroads, Yell County, Arkansas

or the following historic communities:

 Crossroads, Pulaski County, Arkansas
 Cross Roads, Benton County, Arkansas
 Cross Trails, Sevier County, Arkansas